Darreh Gol or Darreh Gel may refer to:
 Darreh Gol, Fars
 Darreh Gol, Yazd